This article discusses the phonological system of Standard Macedonian (unless otherwise noted) based on the Prilep-Bitola dialect.  For discussion of other dialects, see Macedonian dialects. Macedonian possesses five vowels, one semivowel, three liquid consonants, three nasal stops, three pairs of fricatives, two pairs of affricates, a non-paired voiceless fricative, nine pairs of voiced and unvoiced consonants and four pairs of stops.

Vowels

Schwa
It is written with an apostrophe: . It can also be used for dialectal effect; for example, etc. When spelling aloud, each consonant is followed by the schwa. The individual letters of acronyms are pronounced with the schwa in the same way: .

Vowel length
Vowel length is not phonemic. Vowels in stressed open syllables in disyllabic words with stress on the penult can be realized as long, e.g. 'Veles'. 'colloq. hour'.

Consonants

They have various other pronunciations, depending on dialect.

 The alveolar trill is syllabic between two consonants; for example,   'finger'. The dental nasal and velarised lateral are also syllabic in certain foreign words; e.g.   'newton',    'Popocatépetl', etc.

 The velar fricative /x/ does not occur natively in the language. It has been introduced or retained in Standard Macedonian under the following circumstances: (1) new foreign words:   'hotel', (2) toponyms: Ohrid, (3) Church Slavonicisms:   'spirit', (4) new literary words:   'income', and (5) to disambiguate between potential homophones:   'food' vs.   'injury, wound'.

Phonological processes
At morpheme boundaries (represented in spelling) and at the end of a word (not represented in spelling), voicing opposition is neutralized.

Stress
The word stress in Macedonian is antepenultimate, meaning it falls on the third from last syllable in words with three or more syllables, and on the first or only syllable in other words. This is sometimes disregarded when the word has entered the language more recently or from a foreign source. The following rules apply:
 Disyllabic words are stressed on the second-to-last syllable.

For example,   'child',   'mother' and   'father'.
 Trisyllabic and polysyllabic words are stressed on the third-to-last syllable.

For example,   'mountain',   'the mountain' and   'the mountaineers'.

Exceptions include:
 Verbal adverbs (i.e. words suffixed with ): e.g.   'shouting',   'walking'.
 Foreign loanwords: e.g.   'cliché',   'genesis',   'literature', 'Alexander', etc.
 Others.

References

Bibliography
 
 
 
 

Macedonian language
Slavic phonologies